Harry Vickers may refer to:

Harry Edward Vickers (1888–1942), English criminal
Harry Franklin Vickers (1898–1977), American inventor and industrialist
Harry Porter Vickers (1879–1958), American baseball player